Lake Alexandrina is a coastal freshwater lake located between the Fleurieu and Kangaroo Island and Murray and Mallee regions of South Australia, about  south-east of Adelaide.  The lake adjoins the smaller Lake Albert (together known as the Lower Lakes) and a coastal lagoon called The Coorong to its southeast, before draining into the Great Australian Bight via a short, narrow opening known as Murray Mouth.

Nomenclature

Aboriginal naming
Aboriginal people having an association with the lake were reported as knowing it by such names as Mungkuli, Parnka and Kayinga.

European naming
English settlers named the lake after Princess Alexandrina, niece and successor of King William IV of Great Britain and Ireland. When the princess ascended the throne and took the name Queen Victoria, there was some talk of changing the name of the lake to Lake Victoria, but the idea was dropped.

Description
Lake Alexandrina is located north of Encounter Bay and east of Fleurieu Peninsula within what are now the two following South Australian government regions:  Fleurieu and Kangaroo Island region, and the Murray Mallee region. The Murray River is the major river to flow into Lake Alexandrina. Others include the Bremer, Angas, and Finniss rivers, all from the eastern side of the southern Mount Lofty Ranges. The lake is shallow and contains a number of islands near the southern end. Loveday Bay is an inlet located at the south-east of Lake Alexandrina, adjacent to Tauwitchere Channel. Lake Alexandrina is connected by a narrow channel to the smaller Lake Albert to the south-east.

The lake empties into the Southern Ocean via a channel known as the Murray Mouth, south-east of the town of Goolwa, but when the river flow is low, the mouth is often blocked by a sand-bar. Originally subjected to tidal and storm inflows of seawater, the lake is now maintained as a fresh water one by a series of barrages known as the Goolwa Barrages; these cross five channels between the mainland and three islands near the Murray Mouth.

Though the lake has been historically connected to the ocean, the fresh and salt water flows mixed very little, with the lake area remaining fresh over 95% of the time with normal river inflow. Salt water inflows from the ocean would result in relatively little mixing of fresh and salt water, either vertically in the water column or laterally across the flow stream.
An 2020 review of hundreds scientific studies relating to the Coorong, Lower Lakes and Murray Mouth has found that it was a freshwater ecosystem prior to European settlement of South Australia.

Hindmarsh Island is reputed to be the largest island in the world with salt water on one side and fresh water on the other.

History
In Aboriginal mythology known as Dreamtime, the lake was inhabited by a monster known as the Muldjewangk.

Edward Wilson, visiting the lake in the 1850s described it as follows: "Lake Alexandrina is the finest sheet of fresh water I ever saw. Indeed so formidable did it look, with a stiff wind blowing up quite a sufficient swell to make one seasick, that I could scarcely believe it to be fresh. Such is the fact however. It is forty or fifty miles long by twelve or fifteen wide and the shores around it receded into the dim distance until they become invisible, in the way which we are accustomed only with ideas of salt water. Supplied almost entirely by the Murray, the whole lake retains the muddy tinge of which I have spoken, and this sadly detracts from the otherwise beautiful appearances of this magnificent sheet of water."

In 2008, water levels in Lake Alexandrina and Lake Albert became so low that there was a high risk of large quantities of acid sulphate soils forming. The soils on the lake beds are naturally rich in iron sulphides. When exposed to the air, such as may occur in a time of severe drought, the sulphides oxidise, producing sulphuric acid. The barrages now prevent the seawater inflows that had formerly prevented this phenomenon in every drought since the last ice age.  A weir was proposed near Pomanda Point where the river entered the lake, in order to protect upriver and Adelaide's water supplies should it become necessary to open the barrages, but this plan was dropped by the South Australian government after a campaign by the River, Lakes and Coorong Action Group highlighted the many environmental problems such a weir would cause.

Environment
Turtles live in the lake, with lizards and snakes being present along the shoreline. Insect species include dragonflies, a range of moths and butterflies, and large numbers of beetles (coleoptera). Freshwater fish inhabit the lake, including the introduced European carp. The soils around the lake are relatively low in organic carbon, although good barley and vegetable crops may be produced. Non-wetting soils are present along the south eastern bounds of Lake Albert and in areas around Lake Alexandrina.

Birds
The lake is a habitat for many species of waterbird, including migratory waders, or shorebirds, which breed in northern Asia and Alaska. Species supported by the lake include the critically endangered orange-bellied parrots, endangered Australasian bitterns, vulnerable fairy terns, as well as over 1% of the world populations of Cape Barren geese, Australian shelducks, great cormorants and sharp-tailed sandpipers.

Protected area status

Australian government
Lake Alexandrina is part of the wetland complex known as the Coorong and Lakes Alexandrina and Albert Wetland which is listed as a Ramsar site.  The wetland is also appears in the non-statutory list known as A Directory of Important Wetlands in Australia.

South Australian government
Lake Alexandrina includes the following protected areas declared under the National Parks and Wildlife Act 1972 - Currency Creek Game Reserve, Mud Islands Game Reserve, Salt Lagoon Islands Conservation Park and Tolderol Game Reserve.

Non-statutory arrangements
Lake Alexandrina is included within the boundary of the Lakes Alexandrina and Albert Important Bird Area which is an area considered by BirdLife International to be a place of ‘international significance for the conservation of birds and other biodiversity.’

See also
 List of lakes of South Australia
 List of islands within the Murray River in South Australia

References

Murray River
Alexandrina
Ramsar sites in Australia